Stealing Jane was an eight-piece band from New York. They formed in the year 2001 under the name of HyJinX, and changed their name to "Stealing Jane" in 2007. Their music is a combination of rock, pop, R&B and ska.

Biography

The band's name changed from HyJinX to Stealing Jane in 2007 once the band's focus shifted from a mix of original songs along with cover song material to original material only.

Stealing Jane (HyJinX) has played at venues such as Giants Stadium, The Bitter End, BB Kings, and the Webster Theater. They have played with OneRepublic, Spin Doctors, Lifehouse, Hanson, Pepper, Toots & the Maytals, Catch 22, Big D and The Kids Table, Big Bad Voodoo Daddy, Zox, RX Bandits, and Eve 6, among other acts.

As HyJinx, they received first place in the Long Island Music Festival, held by Long Island, NY publication Good Times Magazine. They have received radio play in 15 states. Stealing Jane's music appeared on XM radio, with Opie and Anthony in 2007. They reviewed the band's single "Heartbreaker", which received a great deal of positive response. The EP Say Something was released in August 2007.

Personnel
Bryce Larsen – lead vocals, rhythm guitar
Matt Giordano – lead guitar, backing vocals
Brian Bunce – bass guitar, backing vocals (formerly trumpet)
Dave Calzone – trombone
Jesse Sears – keyboards
Brett Newman – drums
Former members
 Pasquale Iannelli – Saxophone
 Andrew Mericle - Trumpet
 Will Tully - Drums
 Anthony "Vito" Fraccalvieri – Drums
 George McRedmond - Bass guitar, Backing Vocals
 Brian Cano - Drums & Percussion

References

External links
Stealing Jane's Official Website

Musical groups from Long Island
Rock music groups from New York (state)
Musical groups established in 2001